Glenda Baskin Glover, Ph.D, JD, CPA, began serving as the eighth president of Tennessee State University on January 2, 2013.

Early life and education

Glover was born in Memphis, Tennessee, and was raised in the Weaver Road vicinity near Boxtown. She began her educational development as a student at Tennessee State University, where she majored in mathematics.  After graduating with honors with a Bachelor of Science degree, she earned the Master of Business Administration at Clark Atlanta University in 1976. She completed her doctorate in business from George Washington University in 1990, and completed her law degree from the Georgetown University Law Center in 1994.

Career
Glover began serving as President of Tennessee State University on January 2, 2013.  She was formerly the Dean of the College of Business at Jackson State University in Jackson, Mississippi, where she led the College of Business throughout the accreditation process, and spearheaded the implementation of the nation's first Ph.D programs in Business at an HBCU. She is a certified public accountant and an attorney, and is one of two African American women in the nation to hold the Ph.D-CPA-JD combination. Prior to joining Jackson State University, Dr. Glover served as Chairperson of the Department of Accounting at Howard University. Her past employment also includes positions as Senior Vice President and Chief Financial Officer of an engineering firm, a tax manager at a major public utility company, and an accountant with a Big-Four CPA firm.

Awards and honors
Glover has been a corporate board member of three publicly traded corporations. She served as Chair of the Audit Committee or Financial Expert on each board.  Dr. Glover serves as the International President of Alpha Kappa Alpha sorority, Incorporated, and is a member of its board of directors. She is the author of more than one hundred articles and papers, and is regarded as one of the nation's experts on corporate governance. She is a member of several professional, civic, and non-profit organizations, and is the recipient of numerous awards and honors. Dr. Glover is former chairman of the Board of Commissioners of the Jackson (Mississippi) Airport Authority. In 2013, Dr. Glover was named to Diverse Issues in Higher Education's prestigious list as one of the "Top 25 Women in Higher Education".

Personal life
Glover is married to Charles Glover, and they have two adult children, attorney Candace Glover and Dr. Charles Glover II.

References

Living people
People from Memphis, Tennessee
Tennessee State University alumni
Clark Atlanta University alumni
George Washington University School of Business alumni
Georgetown University Law Center alumni
Howard University faculty
Jackson State University faculty
Tennessee State University presidents
Year of birth missing (living people)
21st-century African-American women
Alpha Kappa Alpha presidents